The Rider Broncs women's basketball team is the basketball team that represents Rider University in Lawrenceville, New Jersey. The school's team competes in the Metro Atlantic Athletic Conference.

History
Rider's first season in women's basketball was in 1925, though they had periods where they did not play basketball, such as 1926–27, 1930–32, 1958–59, 1962–63, and 1966–1974. They played in the East Coast Conference (ECC) from 1982 to 1992 and the Northeast Conference from 1992 to 1997 before joining the Metro Atlantic Athletic Conference (MAAC) in 1997. They won their first regular season conference championship in 2018-19.

Postseason appearances
The Broncs have made two postseason appearances, doing so in 2017 and 2019 in the WNIT. They have a 0–2 record.

Drafted Players
The program's all-time leading scorer Stella Johnson (basketball) was drafted 29th overall by the Phoenix Mercury in the 2019 WNBA Draft. She has since played 15 games with the Chicago Sky and Washington Mystics in two seasons.

References

External links
 

 
Metro Atlantic Athletic Conference women's basketball